Edzard Hans Wilhelm Reuter (born 16 February 1928) was the CEO of Daimler-Benz from 1987 to 1995.

Edzard Reuter was born in Berlin, his father was the popular social democratic politician and mayor of Berlin from 1948 to 1953, Ernst Reuter. His mother Hanna Reuter née Kleinert was a secretary at the party newspaper Vorwärts. After the Machtergreifung of the NSDAP, the family was forced to flee Germany and they found exile in Ankara, Turkey. So Reuter spent much of his childhood in Turkey. In 1946, Edzard joined the Social Democratic Party of Germany (SPD).

After returning to Germany in 1947, Edzard Reuter studied mathematics and theoretical physics at the University of Berlin (now known as Humboldt University of Berlin), later transferring to the Georg August University of Göttingen. In 1949, he switched over to studying law at the newly founded Free University of Berlin. In 1955, Reuter completed his state examinations. From 1954 to 1956, he was an assistant at the university. After applying for a job for Daimler-Benz and failing, Edzard Reuter became confidential clerk for UFA, the German film studio and then an executive for Bertelsmann, a media corporation.

In 1964, Hanns Martin Schleyer recruited Reuter to work at the Daimler-Benz headquarters in Stuttgart, where he advanced all the way to the board of managers. In July 1987, he succeeded Werner Breitschwerdt as chairman of the board upon recommendation of Alfred Herrhausen. Upon his assumption of office Reuter avowed himself to an "open" corporate culture. The way he exercised his functions was criticized by many including the stock jurist Ekkehard Wenger.

In May 1995, Reuter was succeeded by Jürgen E. Schrempp, who gave up his predecessor's business philosophy choosing instead to emphasize shareholder value. In August 1994, Reuter mentioned himself as a possible candidate for mayor of Berlin, but none of the parties went on to show interest. In 1998, Edzard Reuter became an honorary citizen of Berlin, especially for his dedication for the expansion of the Potsdamer Platz.

1928 births
Living people
Mercedes-Benz Group executives
Businesspeople from Berlin
German expatriates in Turkey